Ulises is a Spanish-language given name. It is the Spanish form of the English name Ulysses, which itself derives from a Latin form of Odysseus (a legendary Greek king).

People with the name
 Ulises Adame de León (born 1959), Mexican politician
 Ulises Blanch (born 1998), American tennis player
 Ulises Carrión (1941–1989), Mexican artist
 Ulises Aurelio Casiano Vargas (born 1933), Puerto Rican Catholic bishop
 Ulises Alfredo Castillo (born 1992), Mexican cyclist
 Ulises Dávila (born 1991), Mexican footballer
 Ulises de la Cruz (born 1974), Ecuadorian footballer
 Ulises Dumont (1937–2008), Argentine actor
 Ulises Francisco Espaillat (1823–1878), President of the Dominican Republic
 Ulises Estrella (1939–2014), Ecuadorian poet
 Ulises Hadjis, Venezuelan singer
 Ulises Heureaux (1845–1899), President of the Dominican Republic
 Ulises Humala, Peruvian academic
 Ulises Jaimes (born 1996), Mexican footballer
 Ulises Mendivil (born 1980), Mexican footballer
 Ulises Pascua (born 1989), Argentine footballer
 Ulises Poirier (1897–1977), Chilean footballer
 Ulises Ramírez Núñez (born 1967), Mexican politician
 Ulises Ramos (1919–2002), Chilean footballer
 Ulises Rivas (born 1996), Mexican footballer
 Ulises Rosales del Toro (born 1942), Cuban politician
 Ulises Ruiz Ortiz (born 1958), Mexican politician
 Ulises Armand Sanabria (1906–1969), American inventor
 Ulises Saucedo (1896–1963), Bolivian footballer
Ulises Segura (born 1993), Costa Rican footballer
 Ulises Solís (born 1981), Mexican boxer
 Ulises Tavares (born 1993), Mexican footballer
 Ulises Váldez (born 1948), Cuban cyclist

See also
 Ulisses, the Portuguese variant of the name
 Ulysses (2011 film), titled Ulisses in some countries

Spanish masculine given names